Angèle Mukakayange was a Rwandan politician. She was the first woman to be elected as a member of parliament in Rwanda.

Angèle Mukakayange was elected as a MDR-Parmehutu Deputy for Butare in the 1965 Rwandan general election. She lost her seat in the 1969 election.

References

Year of birth missing
Possibly living people
Members of the Parliament of Rwanda
20th-century Rwandan women politicians
20th-century Rwandan politicians